Lieutenant-Colonel W. G. B. Dickson was an acting Commander of the Ceylon Defence Force. He was appointed on 6 March 1914. He was succeeded by the acting Edward James Hayward.

References

Commanders of the Ceylon Defence Force